Fire lily may refer to:

Plants 
 Members of the African and Asian genus Gloriosa
 Lilium bulbiferum, in family Liliaceae
 Members of the South American genus Pyrolirion (family Amaryllidaceae), named for the color of their flowers
 Several South African species in genus Cyrtanthus (family Amaryllidaceae) that bloom after a fire

Fictional characters 
 Elednor (English: Fire Lily), a character in the Pellinor fantasy series by Australian author Alison Croggon

Other 
 Feuerlilie (English: Fire Lily) was the code name of a German anti-aircraft missile